The 2008–09 Iowa Hawkeyes women's basketball team represented the University of Iowa during the 2008–09 NCAA Division I women's basketball season. The Hawkeyes finished the season with a record of 21–11, 13–5 in Big Ten, and finished the regular season tied for second place in the Big Ten. They advanced to the semifinals of the Big Ten Women's Basketball Tournament where they lost to Ohio State. They received at-large bid of the NCAA women's tournament where they lost in the first round, to Georgia Tech.

Roster 

 Head coach: Lisa Bluder
 Associate Head Coach: Jan Jensen
 Assistant coaches: Jenni Fitzgerald, Shannon Gage

Schedule

References 

Iowa Hawkeyes women's basketball seasons
Iowa
Iowa Hawkeyes
Iowa Hawkeyes
Iowa